Forest Hills or Forrest Hills may refer to:

Places

United States
 Forest Hills (Tampa), Florida
 Forest Hills, Illinois, a neighborhood in Western Springs
 Forest Hills, Kentucky
 Forest Hills, Boston, Massachusetts
 Forest Hills Cemetery
 Forest Hills, Michigan
 Forest Hills, Queens, in New York City
 Forest Hills, North Carolina
 Forest Hills, Pennsylvania
 Forest Hills, Tennessee
 Forrest Hills, Tennessee
 Forest Hills, Dallas, Texas
 Forest Hills, Virginia
 Forest Hills, Kanawha County, West Virginia
 Forest Hills (Washington, D.C.)

Elsewhere
 Forest Hills, Nova Scotia, Canada
 Forest Hills, Kloof, South Africa

Schools 
 Forest Hills High School (disambiguation)
 Forest Hills Public Schools, Kent County, Michigan
 Forest Hills Local School District, a public school district in Hamilton County, Ohio
 Forest Hills School District, a public school district in Cambria County, Pennsylvania

See also
 Forest Hills Historic District (disambiguation)
 Forest Hills station (disambiguation)
 Forest Hill (disambiguation)